Events from the year 1743 in Russia

Incumbents
 Monarch – Elizabeth I

Events

Births

 
 June 23 - Catherine Shuvalova,  Russian courtier. (d. 1816)

Deaths

References

1743 in Russia
Years of the 18th century in the Russian Empire